The Quincy Historic District is a U.S. Historic District (designated as such on November 9, 1978) located in Quincy, Florida. The district is bounded by Sharon, Clark, Stewart, and Corry Streets. It contains 145 historic buildings.

References

Geography of Gadsden County, Florida
Historic districts on the National Register of Historic Places in Florida
National Register of Historic Places in Gadsden County, Florida